XHPIC-FM is a radio station on 102.1 FM in Pichucalco, Chiapas. It is part of the state-owned Radio Chiapas state network and is known as Frecuencia V Norte.

XHPIC was established in 2003.

References

Radio stations in Chiapas
Public radio in Mexico